Věžná may refer to:

 Věžná (Pelhřimov District), a village in the Czech Republic
 Věžná (Žďár nad Sázavou District), a village in the Czech Republic